The fourth series of the Australian cooking game show MasterChef Australia premiered on Sunday, 6 May 2012 at 7.30pm on Network Ten. Judges George Calombaris, Gary Mehigan and Matt Preston returned from the previous series. After the first week in Melbourne, the competition took the contestants to places nationally, such as Kangaroo Island and Tasmania, as well as the international destination, Italy. It also featured a number of guest chefs, including Jamie Oliver, Rick Stein and Buddy Valastro.

The fourth series was won by Andy Allen who defeated Julia Taylor and Audra Morrice in the grand finale on 25 July 2012. Andy would later go on to be a judge on the show himself.

Changes
For the first time, the initial Top 50 portion of the show took place in and around Melbourne, Victoria. Contestants faced challenges at the Royal Exhibition Building and the South Melbourne Market, and visited Red Hill on the Mornington Peninsula, the Lake House in Daylesford, and Montsalvat in Eltham.

Sunday night challenges returned to the more traditional Mystery Box/Invention Test combination used in the first two series.

After featuring a range of challengers in Series 3 such as contestants and apprentices, Immunity Challenges now typically featured guest chefs (along with a team of helpers) facing off against the chosen contestant plus their choice of two contestant helpers. Both the contestant team and challenging team had to prepare three courses using a core ingredient provided, with the contestants gaining a time advantage (ninety minutes to sixty, for example). Matt Moran acted as a mentor to the contestant team.

There was no Second Chance Cook Off this season, so eliminated contestants had no chance to return.

The Grand Finale featured three finalists instead of two.

Contestants

Top 24
After a series of auditions and challenges, the winner was determined on 25 July 2012.

Future appearances
In the Special All Stars Series Andy Allen, Julia Taylor, Ben Milbourne and Amina Elshafi appeared for the seafood challenge to help the final 4 for which Julia helped contestant Kate Bracks to win.
In Series 5 Kylie Miller appeared as a guest Judge for an elimination challenge, Ben appeared as a guest for Masterclass and Andy also appeared on Masterclass as well as the Grand Final.
In Series 6 Andy appeared as a Guest Judge for a Mystery Box and Invention Test Challenge.
In a superstar themed week in Series 7 Kylie appeared as a guest chef to set a pressure test, while Andy and Ben appeared as team captains for a team challenge.
Kylie also appeared on Series 9 as guest judge for another pressure test.
Andy appeared at the Auditions in Series 10 to support the top 50.
In Series 11 Andy appeared as a guest chef to compete against contestant Sandeep Pandit, was ultimately lost to Sandeep's perfect score.
Andy (as a judge), Ben and Amina appeared on Series 12. Ben was eliminated on 26 April 2020, finishing 22nd and Amina was eliminated on 12 May 2020, finishing 17th.
In Series 14 Mindy Woods appeared for another chance to win the title. Mindy was eliminated on 28 June 2022, finishing 7th.

Audra's prior cooking experience
Australian newspaper The Sunday Telegraph reported that contestant Audra Morrice, whose occupation is listed as "account manager", actually owns a catering company called Audra's Gourmet Kitchen. The rules for the 2012 series, however, clearly state that contestants cannot have had any professional cooking experience, be it in a restaurant, catering, hotels or cookery education. The rules also exclude contestants who have done food preparation on a 'casual' or 'part-time' basis. The only exemptions to these clauses are reserved for those who have either worked in food service, or for very rudimentary food preparation such as sandwich making and fast food restaurants. A producer from Shine Australia has told The Telegraph: "Audra was upfront with producers regarding Audra’s Gourmet Kitchen. Her full-time employment was as a senior account manager with AAPT and this was a home-based hobby reserved for family and friends."

Years after competed in this series, Morrice would later take the role as judge in MasterChef Asia & MasterChef Singapore.

Guest Chefs
Shannon Bennett - Top 50: Part 4, Finals Week Elimination 3
Jacques Reymond - Top 50: Part 5, Finals Week Elimination 3
Dan Hong - Immunity Challenge 1
Phillipa Grogan - MasterClass 2
Peter Gilmore - Pressure Test 1
Darren Robertson - Immunity Challenge 2
Maggie Beer - Pressure Test 2
Buddy Valastro - Pressure Test 2
Shaun Presland - Immunity Challenge 3
Jason Jones - MasterClass 4
Philippe Leban - Immunity Challenge 4
Rick Stein - Sunday Challenge 4
Lorraine Pascale - MasterClass 5
Jamie Oliver - Immunity Challenge 5
Julie Goodwin - Sunday Challenge 5
Adam Liaw - Sunday Challenge 5
Kate Bracks - Sunday Challenge 5
Hamish Ingham - Immunity Challenge 6
Kumar Mahadevan - Offsite Challenge 6
Christine Manfield - Pressure Test 5, Grand Finale
Daniel Wilson - Immunity Challenge 7
Heston Blumenthal - Sunday Challenge 7
Vincent Gadan - Pressure Test 6, Offsite Challenge 9
Tomislav Martinovic - Immunity Challenge 8
Marco Pierre White - Elimination Challenge 8
Massimo Bottura - Sunday Challenge 8
Antonio Carluccio - Immunity Challenge 9
Gualtiero Marchesi - Italy Team Challenge
Neil Perry - MasterClass 10
Massimo Spigaroli - MasterClass 10
Grant King - Pressure Test 7
Kylie Kwong - Elimination Challenge 10
Adriano Zumbo - Offsite Challenge 9
Kirsten Tibbles - Offsite Challenge 9
Dean Gibson - Offsite Challenge 9
Darren Purchese - Offsite Challenge 9
Alistair Wise - Offsite Challenge 9
Philippa Sibley - Offsite Challenge 9
Guillaume Brahimi - Finals Week Elimination 1
John Torode - Finals Week Elimination 2
Mark Best - Finals Week Elimination 3
Peter Doyle - Finals Week Elimination 3

Elimination chart

  In Week 1, through a series of auditions and Top 50 challenges the judges selected the top twenty-four contestants.
  In Weeks 2 and 5, there was no Bottom 3 for the Sunday Challenge.
  In Week 5 (Tasmania Week), Monday's challenge was a 4-Team Challenge. The losing team did not face elimination. The winning team competed for a spot in the Immunity Challenge.
  In Week 5 (Tasmania Week), the final round of the Elimination Challenge was a draw, and therefore neither contestant was eliminated.
  In Week 6, contestants were grouped in threes for the Invention Test; the winning team all competed in the Immunity challenge, while the losing team all fell into a Pressure Test.
  In Week 7, there was no Invention Test; the Mystery Box Challenge decided the Top and Bottom contestants.
  In Week 8, Audra and Ben won an individual challenge and did not take part in the Team Challenge. The Team Challenge featured three teams of 4, with the worst two teams facing the Elimination Challenge.
  In Week 9, there was no Mystery Box Challenge.
  In Week 9, the Elimination Challenge was a double elimination.
  In Week 10 (Italy Week), Sunday's challenge was a 5-Team Challenge. There was no losing team. The winning team members competed for a spot in the Immunity Challenge.
  In Semi-Final Week, Mindy, Kylie and Alice used their immunity pins to avoid the Elimination Challenge.
  In Semi-Final Week, Audra won an individual challenge and did not take part in the Team Challenge. Contestants were paired up for the Team Challenge with the winning team escaping elimination.
  In Finals Week, Sunday, Monday and Tuesday featured elimination challenges.
  In the Finale, the first round was an elimination round. Audra scored the fewest points and became the Third Place finisher.

Episodes and Ratings

References

External links
Official Site

2012 Australian television seasons
MasterChef Australia
Television shows filmed in Italy